Anke "Birnie" Rodenburg (born 1943, Doornspijk) is a Dutch sculptor known for representational figurative bronzes.

References

External links
 Official Anke Birnie website
 Galerie Terbeek
 Curriculum vitae

1943 births
Living people
20th-century Dutch sculptors
Dutch women sculptors
People from Elburg
20th-century Dutch women artists
21st-century Dutch women artists